Christ Church Episcopal is a historic church building in Beatrice, Nebraska. It was built in 1889-1890 for the local Episcopal congregation established in 1873. The building was designed in the Gothic Revival style by Mendelsson & Laurie. The rectory was built in 1951. The property has been listed on the National Register of Historic Places since November 29, 1999.

References

National Register of Historic Places in Gage County, Nebraska
Gothic Revival architecture in Nebraska
Episcopal church buildings in Nebraska
Churches completed in 1889